The 1914 Minnesota lieutenant gubernatorial election took place on November 3, 1914. Incumbent Lieutenant Governor J. A. A. Burnquist of the Republican Party of Minnesota defeated Minnesota Democratic Party challenger Charles M. Andrist, Socialist Party of Minnesota candidate Andrew Hanson, and Prohibition Party candidate A. W. Piper.

Results

External links
 Election Returns

Lieutenant Gubernatorial
Minnesota
1914